Last Gang may refer to:

 Last Gang Records
 The Last Gang (band)